Ischnobathra is a genus of moths in the family Cosmopterigidae.

Species
Ischnobathra balanobola Meyrick, 1937
Ischnobathra dormiens Meyrick, 1937

References
Natural History Museum Lepidoptera genus database

Cosmopteriginae